Campylostachys is a genus of flowering plants in the family Stilbaceae described as a genus in 1832.

There is only one known species, Campylostachys cernua, endemic to the Cape Province region of South Africa.

formerly included
now in Euthystachys Kogelbergia 
Campylostachys abbreviata E.Mey 1838 not E.Mey. 1843,  syn of Euthystachys abbreviata (E.Mey.) A.DC.
Campylostachys phylicoides Sond. syn of Kogelbergia phylicoides (A.DC.) Rourke

names in Cyperaceae
In 1843, Meyer used the same name to refer to some plants in the Cyperaceae, thus creating an illegitimate homonym. Meyer's genus name and the species name he created in the genus are invalid as well as illegitimate, as they were published without descriptions.
Campylostachys E.Mey. 1843 syn of Fimbristylis Vahl 1805
Campylostachys abbreviata E.Mey. 1843 not E.Mey. 1838, syn of Fimbristylis ferruginea (L.) Vahl

References

Lamiales genera
Stilbaceae
Endemic flora of South Africa